Polzunovo is a rural locality (a station) in Barnaul, Altai Krai, Russia. The population was 332 as of 2013. There are 3 streets.

Geography 
Polzunovo is located 12 km southwest of Barnaul by road. Borzovaya Zaimka is the nearest rural locality.

References 

Rural localities in Barnaul urban okrug